Peter Votter was an Italian luger.

Votter competed in the early 1970s; a natural track luger, he won a gold medal in the men's doubles event at the 1973 FIL European Luge Natural Track Championships in Taisten, Italy.

References

Year of birth missing (living people)
Living people
Sportspeople from Südtirol
Italian male lugers